Skyline High School is a public magnet school in the Buckner Terrace area of Dallas, in the U.S. state of Texas. Skyline is a part of the Dallas Independent School District (DISD) and  serves grades 9 through 12.

In 2015, the school was rated "Met Standard" by the Texas Education Agency.

History 
In the mid-1960s, B. J. Stamps, Bragg Stockton, and other Dallas educators conceived the idea of a very large high school for the Dallas Independent School District that would offer career education in addition to a traditional high-school curriculum. Stamps emphasized continually that the facility he envisioned was "absolutely not going to be a vocational school for unsuccessful students" but rather a place where superior students could undertake studies in preparation for a variety of professions. In December 1966, architectural plans for the school, whose working name was "Science-Technical Center," were approved by the Dallas School Board. By 1969, Stamps, who had been slated as the school's first principal, suggested the name "Skyline High School," inspired by the view of the Downtown Dallas skyline afforded from the school's upper floors, and in February 1970 the Skyline name was approved by the school board.

Classes at Skyline began in the fall semester of 1970. Until the main facility at 7777 Forney Road opened early in 1971, instruction was held at other southeast Dallas sites. From its inception, Skyline has fulfilled Stamps's original conception of offering both a regular high-school curriculum and a multitude of magnet school programs. The magnet offerings are organized as clusters, which are collectively called the Career Development Center. A student attending Skyline may generally choose between two options: pursuing a normal, traditional curriculum (Skyline's original attendance zone was drawn to relieve overcrowding at Samuell and Bryan Adams high schools); or attending both a cluster and regular classes at Skyline.

In the early years of Skyline's existence, administrators and faculty of existing, traditional high schools in the Dallas Independent School District frequently expressed resentment of Skyline's desire to recruit their talented and gifted students and in some instances actively resisted recruitment efforts. District officials appointed a task force to address these concerns. Nevertheless, with the continued existence of Skyline's magnet programs and the subsequent "spinning off" of several independent magnet schools, the issue has persisted to the present day, and district officials continue efforts to allay feelings of resentment.

Over time, numerous clusters have left Skyline and moved into facilities of their own, becoming full-fledged DISD magnet high schools. For example, the Performing Arts Cluster and the Health Careers Cluster both discontinued their affiliations with Skyline in 1976 and became, respectively, the (presently-named) Booker T. Washington High School for the Performing and Visual Arts and the High School for the Health Professions (now the School of Health Professions at Yvonne A. Ewell Townview Magnet Center). In 2007, district officials announced a plan to relieve overcrowding at Skyline by moving several Skyline magnet programs to Emmett J. Conrad High School, meanwhile hoping to increase the latter's achievement levels. These actions have in some instances occasioned resentment by Skyline's own faculty and educational community, who have worried that Skyline's Career Development Center was created only to ultimately self-destruct, and, in the most recent events, that successful students educated at Skyline are being used to artificially boost another school's academic standing. District officials continue in their efforts to respond to these controversies.

Skyline served grades 10 and 11 in 1970–1971, and grades 10–12 from 1971 to 1976. The school has included grades 9–12 since the fall of 1976. Since its opening Skyline has consistently been DISD's largest high school in terms of enrollment. As of 2015, Skyline is one of the largest predominately Hispanic high schools in Texas with over 70% of the 4,500+ students identifying as Hispanic.

In 1971 Nolan Estes, the DISD superintendent, referred to it as a "magnet school" upon its introduction; Jim Schutze of the Dallas Observer wrote that "According to Skyline lore, it is the oldest and biggest magnet school in the nation."

Athletics 
The Skyline Raiders compete in the following sports:

Baseball
Basketball
Cross Country
Football
Golf
Soccer
Softball
Swimming and Diving
Tennis
Track and Field
Volleyball
Wrestling

School performance 
Skyline High School is among the top rated high schools in the nation as recognized by US News magazine. About 90% of the students graduate yearly while averaging 1000 students per graduating class.

A team of Skyline students won the United States National Academic Championship in 1985.

Feeder patterns 
Elementary schools that feed into Skyline include Frank Guzick, Edna Rowe, Adelfa Callejo, George W. Truett, and Urban Park.

Harold W. Lang, Sr. Middle School and Ann Richards Middle School (partial ) feed into Skyline.

Notable alumni 
In order of graduation:
Lanham Lyne '72, Texas state representative, former mayor of Wichita Falls, Texas
Kyle Gann '73, classical composer, musicologist, music critic, author, and educator
Brent Bourgeois '74, Christian rock musician and producer
Michael Weiss '76, jazz pianist, composer, bandleader, recording artist
Terry Crouch '77, professional football Player 81- Baltimore Colts.
J. David Spurlock '78, author, artist, art professor, artist's rights advocate
Richard Dominguez '79, comic book artist "El Gato Negro"
Peri Gilpin '79, actress (best known as "Roz Doyle" on Frasier)
Hector Cantú '80, writer, editor, newspaper comic strip creator
Keith Miller '80, major league baseball player
Joe Riley '82, visual and plastic artist, SubGenius
Deryl Dodd '82, country music artist
Dante Jones '83, NFL football player
Tim Jackson '84, NFL football player
Michael Johnson '86, world and Olympic champion sprinter
Larry Johnson '87, NBA basketball star
"Cowboy Troy" Coleman '89, country music artist
Aaron D. Ford '90, Nevada State Senator and Attorney General
Chris Holt '90, major league baseball player
Steve Holy '90, country music singer
John Yuan '92, actor, best known for Observe and Report
Matthew Yuan '92, actor, best known for Observe and Report
Allen Rossum '94, NFL football player
Antonio Wilson '95, NFL football player
Josh Bell '03, NFL and CFL football player
Jason Siggers '03, Israel Basketball Premier League basketball player
Mikail Baker '05, NFL football player
Calvin "C. J." Miles, Jr. '05, NBA basketball player
Omar Gonzalez '06, MLS Soccer Player
Mike Morgan '06, NFL football player, Super Bowl Champion
Troy Stoudermire '08, CFL football player
Steve Williams '09, NFL football player
Mike Davis '10, NFL football player
Corey Nelson '10, NFL football player for the Atlanta Falcons, Super Bowl 50 Champion
Paul Dawson '11, NFL football player
Zach LeDay ('12, but transferred to The Colony High School for senior year), Israeli Basketball Premier League player
Ra'Shaad Samples '13, NFL assistant coach
Aaron Brewer '16, NFL football player
Marcus Garrett '17, basketball player, signed two-way contract with NBA Miami Heat

References

External links 

Skyline Center Celebrates 40 Years, a video produced by Dallas Schools Television, featuring the early history of Skyline Center. Retrieved 2013-02-08.

Dallas Independent School District high schools
Public high schools in Dallas
Public magnet schools in Dallas
1970 establishments in Texas
Educational institutions established in 1970